Nong Khae is a district (amphoe) in the southern part of Saraburi province, central Thailand.

History
Records show that the district existed in 1899.

Nong Khae has the Na Roeng khlong (canal) that connects to the Pa Sak River. The Ayutthaya Kingdom army moved their troops by this canal for military purposes.

Recently there has been immigration of people from Lan Na and Vientiane to this district.

Geography
Neighboring districts are (from the north clockwise): Nong Saeng, Mueang Saraburi, and Wihan Daeng of Saraburi Province; Nong Suea of Pathum Thani province; and Wang Noi, Uthai, and Phachi of Ayutthaya province.

Administration
The district is divided into 18 sub-districts (tambons), which are further subdivided into 181 villages (mubans). There are three municipal (thesaban) areas, and a further 16 tambon administrative organizations (TAO).

Nong Khae